District 13 (French title Banlieue 13 or B13), is a 2004 French action film directed by Pierre Morel and written and produced by Luc Besson. It depicts parkour in several stunt sequences completed without wires or computer-generated imagery. Because of this, some film critics drew comparisons to the Thai film Ong-Bak. David Belle plays Leïto, the story's main character.

Plot
In 2010, social problems have overrun the poorer suburbs of Paris. Especially Banlieue 13, commonly referred to as B13: a ghetto with a population of two million people. Unable to control B13, the authorities surround the entire area with a high wall topped by barbed tape, forcing the inhabitants within to survive without education, proper utilities or police protection. Police checkpoints stop anybody going in or out. Three years later, the district has become overrun with gangs. Leïto is a fighter of such gangs, who disposes of a case of drugs down a drain, then escapes the gang led by K2, an enforcer who has come to collect the drugs. 

The gang's leader, a ruthless man named Taha Ben Mahmoud, is angered and executes three of K2's men until K2 suggests they kidnap Leïto's sister Lola in retaliation. Lola is captured by K2 at a supermarket. Leïto is able to rescue her and take Taha to the police station, but the police chief in charge betrays and arrests Leïto, saying they are leaving the district and are not willing to stand up to the gangs. Taha leaves with Lola. Despite the chief saying sorry, Leito is angered by the excuses and kills the chief out of frustration by breaking his neck.

6 months later, Damien Tomaso, an undercover officer, completes a successful operation at an underground casino in Paris, single-handedly taking down or gunning down the casino's guards and arresting the pit boss. His next assignment is briefed by Kruger, a government official. Taha's gang has taken a bomb from a nuclear transport vehicle and accidentally activated it, giving it 24 hours before it wipes out the district. Posing as a prisoner, Damien infiltrates the district to disarm the bomb. Leïto immediately sees through Damien's cover, but the two reluctantly team up to save Leïto's sister as well. The pair surrenders to Taha in order to gain access to his base, where they find the bomb has been set up on a missile launcher aimed at Paris, with Lola handcuffed to it. 

Taha demands a high ransom to deactivate the bomb; the government refuses. After Damien gives them Taha's bank account codes, they drain his funds. Leïto and Damien escape. K2 and his men soon realize that with Taha unable to pay them, they are free from his grasp. Taha attempts to command K2 as a last resort, but K2, fed up with Taha's brutality, turns his back on his former boss and allows his men to gun down Taha. K2 takes over the gang and goes to find Leito and Damien. After a footchase K2 catches up with Leito and Damien but calls a truce and allows Leito and Damien to disarm the bomb. 

Leito and Damien reach the bomb but are forced to fight a large man named Yeti who was planted by Taha to guard the bomb. After they defeat Yeti, Damien calls Kruger to receive the deactivation code. After hearing Kruger ask if the "bomb is in the exact spot" and recognizing "B13" in the code's last characters, Leïto deduces that the government has framed them, and the code will actually detonate the bomb instead of deactivating it. Damien refuses to believe that the government has set him up, and he fights Leito as Damien truly believes that he is doing the right thing to disarm the bomb, but Lola is able to restrain Damien long enough for the timer on the bomb to run out. 

The bomb does not explode, proving Leïto right. K2 and his gang allow Leito and Damien to leave the district. The pair return to the government building with the bomb and use it to force Kruger to admit that he had planned to blow up B13 as a means to end its existence, catching it on camera and broadcasting nationally. Soon, the rest of the government promises to tear down the containment wall and bring back schools and police to B13. Leïto and Damien depart as friends, and Lola kisses Damien, encouraging him to visit B13.

Cast
 David Belle as Leïto
 Cyril Raffaelli as Damien Tomaso
 Tony D'Amario as K2
 Dany Verissimo as Lola
  as Taha Ben Mahmoud (sometimes credited as Bibi Naceri)
  as Krüger
 Nicolas Woirion as Corsini
  as The Colonel
 Samir Guesmi as Jamel
 Jeff Rudom as Yeti
 Lyes Salem as Samy

Reception 
District 13 received mostly positive reviews outside France. On Rotten Tomatoes, it has a rating of 80% based on 116 reviews. The website's critical consensus reads, "A nonstop thrill ride, District B13's dizzying action sequences more than make up for any expository flaws." On Metacritic, it has a weighted average score of 70 out of 100 based on reviews from 28 critics, indicating "generally favorable reviews".

In France, reviews were slightly less positive. The main issues discussed by the French critics were the similarity with both Escape from New York and Ong Bak, and the shallowness of the plot. Lisa Nesselson of Variety notes the comparison, but says, although the narrative is derivative it "rarely feels that way thanks to bullet pacing, nifty choreography and a few well-placed rejoinders" and also called it "fast, dumb fun". Nathan Lee of The New York Times that the director "hasn't reinvented this particular wheel, but he gets it spinning with delirious savoir-faire."

Several other critics also praised the film's action scenes and stunt work. Frank Scheck of The Hollywood Reporter wrote: "By most standards, District B13 is a fairly routine summer action movie, albeit one in French. But what makes it unique are the truly amazing and kinetic action scenes featuring Parkour pioneer Belle and co-star Cyril Raffaelli." Wesley Morris of The Boston Globe remarked, "Like its stunt work, the movie is both ridiculously hyperactive and a muscular feat of absolute confidence. I don't expect to have a more adrenalizing time at the movies this summer."

Sequel
Filming of a sequel, originally titled Banlieue 14, began in August 2008 in Belgrade, Serbia, and continued until October 2008. David Belle and Cyril Raffaelli both reprised their original roles of Leito and Damien, respectively. The film with Luc Besson again producing and writing the screenplay. The title for the sequel was officially changed to District 13: Ultimatum in the post-production stages. It was released in France on February 18, 2009, and the UK on October 2, 2009.

Remake

Brick Mansions is an English-language remake of the film. Set in Detroit, it began pre-production in 2010 by EuropaCorp. Released in April 2014, it stars Paul Walker as Damien, with David Belle reprising his role from the original and rapper RZA as the gang leader. The film is Walker's final completed film,  before his death in November 2013.

References

External links
 
 
 Interview with director Pierre Morel  at SFFWorld.com

2004 films
2004 action thriller films
French action thriller films
2000s French-language films
Martial arts films
Parkour in film
Dystopian films
Films set in 2010
District 13 films
Films set in the future
French science fiction action films
Films about organized crime in France
Hood films
Films set in Paris
Films directed by Pierre Morel
Films produced by Luc Besson
EuropaCorp films
2004 science fiction action films
2004 directorial debut films
2000s American films
2000s French films